Aglossa rhodalis is a species of snout moth in the genus Aglossa. It was described by George Hampson in 1906 and is known from South Africa, Algeria and Namibia.

References

Moths described in 1906
Pyralini
Insects of Namibia
Moths of Africa